Eupanacra radians is a moth of the  family Sphingidae. It is known from Sumatra.

The length of the forewings is about 24.5 mm. It is similar to Eupanacra sinuata, but smaller, with a clearer pattern and narrower hindwings. The outer half of the underside of the forewings is reddish brown and the inner half is dark brown.

References

Eupanacra
Moths described in 1930